The NC State Wolfpack men's soccer team is a varsity intercollegiate athletic team of North Carolina State University in Raleigh, North Carolina, United States. The team is a member of the Atlantic Coast Conference, which is part of the National Collegiate Athletic Association's Division I. NC State's first men's soccer team was fielded in 1950. The team plays its home games at Dail Soccer Stadium in Raleigh. The Pack is coached by George Kiefer.

The Wolfpack had much of their success in the mid-1980s to the mid-1990s, where over the span of 10 seasons, the Pack appeared in eight NCAA Tournaments. During this time, the Wolfpack won, to date, their only ACC Men's Soccer Tournament title, coming in 1990, as well as their only ACC Regular Season title, coming in 1994. Since then, the Wolfpack have made the NCAA Tournament on three occasions, qualifying in the 2003, 2005 and 2009 editions of the tournament. Additionally, in 1990, the team had their deepest run in the NCAA Tournament, reaching their only College Cup in program history.

Roster

Rivalries 
Much of NC State's rivalries are also rivalries across other collegiate sports. The Wolfpack's primary rival, is the North Carolina Tar Heels, who they contest annually in ACC play. Matches against other in-state ACC opponents, such as Duke and Wake Forest are known as Tobacco Road, due to the state' longstanding history of tobacco production.

Coaching history 
There have been nine head coaches in the program's history.

Individual achievements

All-Americans 

NC State has produced 12 All-Americans. The most recent was Aaron King, who won the honor in 2005.

References 
General
 
 
Footnotes

External links 

 

 
1950 establishments in North Carolina
Association football clubs established in 1950